Jodie Clare Henry, OAM (born 17 November 1983) is an Australian competitive swimmer, Olympic gold medallist and former world-record holder.

Early life and career

Henry was born in Brisbane, Queensland. She began swimming competitively at the relatively late age of 14. She swam in the Commonwealth Youth Games in Edinburgh, Scotland, later that year, winning five gold medals.

Swimming career

At the 2002 Commonwealth Games in Manchester, Henry won the women's 100 metre freestyle as well as being a member of the Australian teams that won both the 4×100-metre freestyle relay and the 4×100-metre medley relay. Later that year, she won silver at the Pan Pacific Championships in the 50- and 100-metre freestyle, and helped Australian teams to victory over the Americans in the freestyle and medley relays.

In 2003, Henry won the 100-metre silver medal, and picked up bronze medals in both the 4×100-metre freestyle and 4×100-metre medley relays at the FINA World Championships in Barcelona. She was also named the Speedo female sprinter of the year for 2003.

2004 Summer Olympics
At the 2004 Summer Olympics, Henry anchored the Australian women's 4×100-metre freestyle relay team that won the gold in world record time. She then competed in the individual 100-metre freestyle, breaking the previous world record time of 53.66 seconds (set by team member Libby Lenton) with a time of 53.52 seconds in the semifinals. She then went on to win the gold medal for the event, the first Australian to do so since Dawn Fraser 40 years earlier. In her final race at Athens she swam the last leg (freestyle) of the 4×100-metre medley relay, again helping the Australian team win gold in world record time, leaving her with three gold medals and three world records.

 women's 4×100-metre freestyle relay
 1st- Australia (Alice Mills, Libby Lenton, Petria Thomas, Jodie Henry) 3:35.94 - world record
 women's 100-metre freestyle
 Semi-final 2: 1st - 53.52 - world record
 Final: 1st - 53.84
 women's 4×100-metre medley relay
 1st - Australia (Giaan Rooney, Leisel Jones, Petria Thomas, Jodie Henry) 3:57.32 - world record

Henry was awarded the Order of Australia Medal that year.

On 29 November 2004, Henry was named the Australian Swimmer of the Year, becoming just the third woman in 15 years to take the honour, joining Susie O'Neill and Hayley Lewis. Henry also snapped Ian Thorpe's five-year streak of receiving the award. She narrowly defeated teammate Petria Thomas to take the honour. Henry was also named Female Sprint Freestyler and her win with Thomas, Giaan Rooney, and Leisel Jones in the 4×100-metre medley relay in Athens was named the Golden Moment of the Year.

After the 2004 Olympics she followed her coach Shannon Rollason to the Australian Institute of Sport.

2005 onwards
Henry won the 100-metre freestyle gold medal at the 2005 World Championships in Montreal, clocking 54.18 seconds. That win came on top of her leadoff role in Australia's victorious 4×100-metre freestyle team and second relay gold as a heat swimmer in the 4×100-metre medley.

She is a friend and was a training partner of Alice Mills under Shannon Rollason, until after nine years, she announced that she would be switching to the tutelage of John Fowlie.

Lenton broke Henry's world record at the Commonwealth Games selection trials, setting a new mark of 53.42 seconds. Henry finished with the silver medal at the 2006 Commonwealth Games, finishing behind compatriot Lenton (24.61) in the 50-metre and (53.54) 100-metre freestyle, clocking 53.78 seconds and a personal best in the 50-metre with 24.72 seconds for another silver behind Lenton. Henry swam in the 4×100-metre freestyle relay, helping Australia to the gold medal.

On 25 March, at the 2007 World Aquatics Championships in Melbourne, Henry claimed gold again. Combining with Shayne Reese, rookie Melanie Schlanger and Libby Lenton, Henry anchored the Australian 4×100-metre freestyle relay team in a world championship record time of 3:35.48 seconds, ahead of the United States in 3:35.68 and the Netherlands in 3:36.81. She also won another gold medal in the 4×100-metre medley relay.

In November 2007, Henry returned to her hometown of Brisbane to regain form under new coach Drew McGregor and training at Chandler Swim Club.

She was unable to qualify for the 2008 Summer Olympics because of a pelvic complaint.

On 30 September 2009, she announced her retirement from swimming.

Personal life
She married Tim Notting, and they have three children.

See also
 List of Olympic medalists in swimming (women)
 List of World Aquatics Championships medalists in swimming (women)
 List of Commonwealth Games medallists in swimming (women)
 World record progression 100 metres freestyle
 World record progression 4 × 100 metres freestyle relay
 World record progression 4 × 100 metres medley relay

References 

1983 births
Living people
Olympic swimmers of Australia
Swimmers at the 2004 Summer Olympics
Sportswomen from Queensland
Olympic gold medalists for Australia
Commonwealth Games silver medallists for Australia
Australian Institute of Sport swimmers
Australian Swimmers of the Year
World record setters in swimming
Commonwealth Games gold medallists for Australia
Australian female freestyle swimmers
World Aquatics Championships medalists in swimming
Swimmers from Brisbane
Medalists at the 2004 Summer Olympics
Olympic gold medalists in swimming
Commonwealth Games medallists in swimming
Swimmers at the 2002 Commonwealth Games
Swimmers at the 2006 Commonwealth Games
Sportspeople from Logan, Queensland
Recipients of the Medal of the Order of Australia
Sport Australia Hall of Fame inductees
21st-century Australian women
Medallists at the 2002 Commonwealth Games
Medallists at the 2006 Commonwealth Games